Koman is a settlement in the former Temal municipality, Shkodër County, northern Albania. At the 2015 local government reform it became part of the municipality Vau i Dejës. The Koman Hydroelectric Power Station has taken the name of the settlement.

The settlement takes its name from the Cumans. Koman also gave the name to the Koman culture, around which is built an important theory of the transition between Illyrians and Albanians.

References

External link

Populated places in Vau i Dejës
Villages in Shkodër County